Harry Elliott  (11 March 1870 – 2 November 1941) was a New Zealand cricketer. He played three first-class matches for Taranaki between 1891 and 1898.

See also
 List of Taranaki representative cricketers

References

External links
 

1870 births
1941 deaths
New Zealand cricketers
Taranaki cricketers
Cricketers from Nelson, New Zealand